Pavala Syamala is an Indian actress from Andhra Pradesh. She has been playing supporting roles in Telugu films since 1984. She made her debut as an actress with the film Babai Abbai.

Personal life
She was born in a Brahmin family. She lost her mother as a child. She studied till her 10th standard. She lost her husband after her daughter is born. She was in financial distress and sought help from the donors. Pawan Kalyan reportedly helped her with a sum of Rs.1 Lakh. Telangana Chief minister K. Chandra Sekhar Rao also helped her with an amount of Rs.20,000 immediately and a monthly pension of Rs.10000. He also promised a two bedroom house from the government side.

Filmography

Challenge (1984)
Babai Abbai (1985)
Mogudu Pellalu (1985)
Swarnakamalam (1988)
Kartavyam (1990)
Babai Hotel (1992)
Suswagatham (1998)
Vivaha Bhojanambu (1988 film) (1988)
Kodanda Ramudu (2000)
Manasantha Nuvve (2001)
Allari Ramudu (2002)
Indra (2002)
Khadgam (2002)
Ninne Istapaddanu (2003)
Andhrawala (2004)
Varsham (2004)
Gowri (2004)
Nuvvostanante Nenoddantana (2005)
Ayodhya (2005)
Andagadu (2005)
Modati Cinema (2005)
Bahumathi (2007)
Blade Babji (2007)
Rainbow (2008)
swathantram(2002)
Baladoor (2008)
Golimaar (2010)
Srimannarayana (2012)
D for Dopidi (2013)
Emo Gurram Egaravachu (2014)
Drushyam(2014)
Guntur Talkies (2016)
Nenu Local  (2016)
Anasuya  (2017)
 Mathu Vadalara (2019)
 Tagore
Golimaar (2010)
Mathu Vadalara (2019)

References

External links

Telugu actresses